St. Nick's Jazz Pub located at 773 St. Nicholas Avenue, in New York City, in the area of Harlem known as Sugar Hill, Manhattan. It was one of the oldest continuous operating jazz club in Harlem specializing in Jazz and Blues. In the 30s it was known as Poosepahtuck. In the 40s it was known as Lucky's Rendezvous and owned by Luckey Roberts. Luckey was Duke Ellington's and George Gershwin's teacher and mentor.  Artists such as Art Tatum, Donald Lambert, known as Donald “The Jersey Rocket” Lambert, Marlowe Morris, Duke Ellington, Clifton Webb, performed at the Rendezvous.

History
In the 30s it was called Pooseepahtuck Club.  Which was named after Poospatuck Native Americans in New York. In the 1930s Joe Jordan was the house pianist, and Monette Moore was a featured vocalist.

In the 40s the club was owned by Luckey Roberts a well known Harlem pianist and composer. He was one of the first Ragtime composers. Luckey Roberts along with James P. Johnson were developers of the stride piano style in 1919. In his later years Luckey Roberts did recordings with Willie "The Lion" Smith, and honky tonk-style piano solos with clarinetist Garvin Bushell.

Luckey Roberts is known for introducing George Gershwin to Jazz. Roberts had close ties to the Duke of Windsor. The Duke of Windsor later became the King of England. During the Duke of Windsor's 1917 trip to the United States he met Luckey. Roberts performed for 17 nights in honor of the Duke. Luckey became the Duke's mentor teaching him rhythms and supplying him with records and sheet music.

In the 50s the club was called Pink Angel and owned by Lillian Lampkin. She was the mother of the current owner Vincent Lampkin.
It became St. Nick’s in the 1960s.

It was known for decades for its late night jazz sessions where some of the best musicians in the area would come to jam. A historic jazz spot in Sugar Hill, Manhattan Harlem. It is legendary for over 50 years.

In the 50s it was renamed Pink Angel. In the 60s it was renamed St Nick's Pub. Many notable musicians, artists, and singers played at St. Nick's Pub over the 50 years, such as; Miles Davis, Billie Holiday, Lena Horne.

Berta Alloway was a music promoter at St. Nick's Pub when it was leased by Earl Spain. In 1993 she started the Monday night jam sessions. Berta and Earl Spain were known to have brought Jazz back to Uptown in Harlem.

The saxophonist Patience Higgins (and late bassist Andy McCloud III) were original St Nick's Pub regulars. They were a part of the house band, along with drummer Dave Gibson, pianists Les Kurtz and Marcus Persiani. The pub was also known for having surprise guests along with regulars; such as Roy Hargrove, Russell Malone, Stanley Turrentine, Tamm E. Hunt, Craig Haynes, Donald Byrd, Frank Lacy, Melvin Vines and the Harlem Jazz Machine (Monday Night Jam Sessions, Atiba Kwabena-Wilson with his band, the Befo’ Quotet, Savion Glover the tap dancer, Vanessa Rubin, David Murray, Stevie Wonder, Lawrence Clark, Wycliffe Gordon, George Braith, Olu Dara, T.C. III, James Carter, Buster Brown, Dennis Llewellyn Day aka Dennis Day, Bill Saxton, Rahn Burton, Gregory Porter, Donald Smith, Leopolda Fleming, Sonny Rollins, Bill Saxton, Wayne Escoffery, Hamiet Bluiett, Sophia Loren Coffee (vocalist & Entertainment Promoter for St. Nick's Pub), Lybya Pugh, Sugar Hill Jazz Quartet, Kathryn Farmer, and Grammy award winner pianist Albert "Chip" Crawford. Chip Crawford is 2017 Grammy Award Jazz album vocalist winner Gregory Porter's pianist.

In December 2011, St. Nick's Pub closed due to not having a renewed liquor license.

On March 22, 2018, St Nick's Pub was damaged by a fire, which resulted in the death of fireman Michael R. Davidson (NY Fire Department - Engine Company 69). As a result of the fire damage, the building was demolished. At the time of the fire, the pub was being used as a movie set for the film  “Motherless Brooklyn", directed by Edward Norton, and starting Norton, Bruce Willis, Willem Dafoe, and Alec Baldwin.

References

External links
ST. NICK’S PUB – THE BEST UNDERGROUND JAZZ IN NEW YORK
Fire Guts Harlem Set Of Ed Norton Movie In NYC
we got it! election night 2008 - st.nicks pub harlem sugarhill
Dr Mambo & the Experience Ensemble @ St Nick's Pub
Olu Dara at St. Nick's
Harlem - Friday Night at St. Nick's Pub, New York
Baixar St Nick s Pub grátis
HARLEM HISTORY, UP IN FLAMES: SHAMEFUL DESTRUCTION ON SUGAR HILL!
James P. Johnson - 16 Songs of Piano Stride & Charleston (Tribute)
Charles "Luckey" Roberts 

Jazz clubs in Harlem
Music venues in Manhattan
Nightlife in New York City